Georgios Roubanis (born July 31, 1929) is a Greek pole vaulter. He was born in Tripoli, Greece. He competed at three Olympic Games. He is the elder brother of Aristeidis. He was named the 1956 Greek Athlete of the Year.

At the 1956 Melbourne Olympic Games, he won a bronze medal in the pole vault, as he scored 4.50 m (Greek record at the time), on 26 November 1956. In order to attend the Melbourne event, Roubanis lost a semester of his studies at UCLA in the United States.  He abandoned athletics in 
1961. After studying political economics, he got his master's degree in local self-government. He had worked in the US for 5 years as a management consultant, for a movie company. He had also set up an advertising company and a printing plant. In sports, he served as the president of the Panhellenic Association of Calisthenics and founded several other associations.

References

External links
 dataOlympics profile
 More about him

1929 births
Living people
Athletes from Tripoli, Greece
Greek male pole vaulters
Athletes (track and field) at the 1952 Summer Olympics
Athletes (track and field) at the 1956 Summer Olympics
Athletes (track and field) at the 1960 Summer Olympics
Olympic athletes of Greece
Olympic bronze medalists for Greece
Panathinaikos Athletics
Medalists at the 1956 Summer Olympics
Olympic bronze medalists in athletics (track and field)
Mediterranean Games silver medalists for Greece
Mediterranean Games medalists in athletics
Athletes (track and field) at the 1955 Mediterranean Games
20th-century Greek people